Trunk 1 is part of the Canadian province of Nova Scotia's system of Trunk Highways.

It is located in the western part of the province and connects Bedford with Yarmouth via the Annapolis Valley. It was known for many years as "the Post Road". The route runs parallel to, and in some places has been replaced by, Highway 101.  Trunk 1 often forms the main street in communities that Highway 101 bypasses.

Just east of Windsor, between Garlands Crossing and Currys Corner, Trunk 1 and Trunk 14 are duplexed for about 2 km.

Route description 
In the Halifax Regional Municipality, Trunk 1  starts in Bedford at the intersection of Rocky Lake Drive and the Bedford Highway on Trunk 2. It is known as Sackville Drive and is the main street through the community of Lower Sackville. The road continues northwest through Middle Sackville, Upper Sackville, and Mount Uniacke to Windsor, where it meets the Avon River. Trunk 1 follows the west bank of the river through Hantsport. At Avonport, Trunk 1 turns west through the Annapolis Valley, following the south bank of the Cornwallis River through Wolfville, New Minas and Kentville.

Bypassing the town of Berwick to the south, Trunk 1 meets the Annapolis River at Aylesford, and runs along the river's north bank through Kingston, Middleton, Lawrencetown and Bridgetown. The road crosses the Annapolis River at Annapolis Royal (on the Annapolis Royal Generating Station), and runs along the southern coast of the Annapolis Basin through Upper Clements and the former site of CFB Cornwallis.

Trunk 1 joins up with Highway 101 at Deep Brook to cross the Bear River, then splits apart to loop through the village of Smith's Cove, across from the town of Digby. Trunk 1 joins up at the western end of this loop, with Highway 101 assuming Trunk 1's former alignment along St. Mary's Bay. A new controlled-access segment of Highway 101 is proposed for this area; and it is assumed Trunk 1 will be re-signed along this stretch if completed.

At Weymouth, Trunk 1 re-appears, and continues south along the coast through the Municipality of Clare to its end in downtown Yarmouth on Main Street at the ferry terminal to Bar Harbor, Maine where it meets the Trunk 3.

History
Trunk 1 is the oldest major road in the province of Nova Scotia. It began as a trail connecting Acadian communities but was expanded by the British as link between the garrison of Annapolis Royal and the provincial capital of Halifax.  It was upgraded to a road and became known in the 19th century as "the Great Western Road" connecting Halifax to its westward hinterland.  It became known as "the post road" in the Annapolis Valley because of its use for mail delivery and stage coach service.  The name "the post road" persists in some circles but today it is more commonly nicknamed "the old number one" in contrast to the newer Highway 101. "Old Windsor Highway" and Rural Route 4 (R.R.4) are also previous designations. A 4.5 km section of the road from its stage coach era has been preserved at the Uniacke Estate Museum Park in Mount Uniacke, Nova Scotia, now used as a hiking trail after  was bypassed by late 19th century rerouting. In 1970, Highway Had a new eastern terminus to Bedford, preventing the coincidences to both highway 2 & 3 which they still began in Halifax. Highway 1 did end in Halifax until the Mackay Bridge opened. This highway used to go .

Major intersections

Communities
Bedford
Lower Sackville
Middle Sackville
Upper Sackville

Roads
Trunk 2
River Lane
Oakmount Drive
Highway 102
Highway 101
Cobequid Road
Old Sackville Road
Twelve Mile House Lane
Hillcrest Avenue
Skyridge Avenue
Armoyan Drive
Oakdale Drive
Pinehill Drive
Leaside Drive
Florence Street
Sackville Cross Road
Riverside Drive
Old Beaver Bank Road
Irene Avenue
Route 354
Connolly Road
Stanley Street
Sharon Drive
Beaver Bank Cross Road
Jubilee Lane
Millwood Drive
Lucasville Road
Melham Drive
Crossfield Ridge
Executive Drive
Beaconsfield Way
Margeson Drive
Wilson Lake Drive
Lively Road
Hamilton Drive
Bambrick Road
Rosemary Drive
Orchard Drive
Springfield Avenue
Fenerty Road
Springfield Lake Road
Lakeview Avenue
Patton Road
Maxwell Avenue
Buttercup Grove

References

 History of Kings County, A.W.H. Eaton
 Rambles, Joseph Howe

See also
 List of Nova Scotia provincial highways

001
001
001
001
001
001
Middleton, Nova Scotia
001